Hospental railway station, is a railway station in the municipality of Hospental, in the Swiss canton of Uri. It is an intermediate stop on the  gauge Furka Oberalp line of the Matterhorn Gotthard Bahn and is served by local trains only.

Services 
The following services stop at Hospental:

References

External links 
 
 

Railway stations in the canton of Uri
Matterhorn Gotthard Bahn stations